Yves Castaldi

Early life
Castaldi was born in Algeria.

Fashion work 
Castaldi in Beverly Hills, California.

Fashion shows 

Berlin, Germany - 1998, 1999, 2000, 2005, 2006

Paris, France - 
Los Angeles, USA - 2004

Milan, Italy - 1998, 1999, 2000

London, UK - 1998, 1999, 2000

New York City, USA - 2004, 2005, 2006

Press and Media 

Castaldi Vogue Magazine, Harper's Bazaar, GQ, Sportwear International, Elle Magazine, Marie Claire, Apparels News, DNR, WWD, Los Angeles Times, Glamour Magazine, New York Times, People Magazine.

External links
 Yves Castaldi And Lionel Deluy
 Noted Fashion Designer - Yves Castaldi

1952 births
French fashion designers
Living people